General Spanky is a 1936 American comedy film produced by Hal Roach. A spin-off of Roach's popular Our Gang short subjects, the film stars George McFarland, Phillips Holmes, Rosina Lawrence, Billie Thomas and Carl Switzer. Directed by Fred Newmeyer and Gordon Douglas, it was originally released to theaters on December 11, 1936, by Metro-Goldwyn-Mayer (MGM).

This film, a Civil War period piece, was intended as an experiment to determine if Roach could move Our Gang into features, as the double feature and block booking were slowly smothering his short subjects production. The film was a box-office disappointment and, after another year of shorts production, Roach ended up selling the Our Gang unit to MGM in May 1938.

When Roach bought the rights to the back catalog of Our Gang films he had produced from MGM in 1949, he did not buy back the rights to General Spanky. The film was part of the MGM catalog acquired in 1986 by Turner Entertainment, which holds the rights today as a subsidiary of Warner Bros. General Spanky was released on VHS and laserdisc in 1991. In 2016 it was released on DVD in Region 1 by Warner Bros. via their Warner Archive Collection.

Plot

Spanky (George McFarland), Alfalfa (Carl Switzer), Buckwheat (Billie Thomas) and others form an army called "The Royal Protection of Women and Children Regiment Club of the World and Mississippi River". The group sees unexpected action when Union troops approach, engaging in battles more farcical than fierce. Using clowning tactics instead of military tactics, the kids stop the advance . . . and later save an adult friend from the firing squad.

Cast

Principal cast
 Spanky McFarland as Spanfield George 'Spanky' Leonard
 Phillips Holmes as Marshall "Marsh" Valient
 Ralph Morgan as Yankee General
 Irving Pichel as Capt. Simmons, The Gambler
 Rosina Lawrence as Louella Blanchard
 Billie "Buckwheat" Thomas as Buckwheat
 Carl "Alfalfa" Switzer as Alfalfa
 Hobart Bosworth as Col. Blanchard
 Robert Middlemass as Overseer
 James Burtis as Boat Captain
 Louise Beavers as Cornelia
 William Best as Henry, the lazy slave

Additional cast
 Harold Switzer as Harold
 Jerry Tucker as Jerry
 Flayette Roberts as Flayette—Gang kid in Army
 John Collum as Our Gang member
 Rex Downing as Our Gang member
 Dickie De Nuet as Our Gang member
 Ernie Alexander as Friend of Marshall
 Hooper Atchley as Slavemaster
 Harry Bernard as Man on the boat
 Jack Daugherty as General's Aid
 Walter Gregory as Capt. Haden
 Karl Hackett as First mate
 Henry Hall as Slavemaster
 Ham Kinsey as Man with paint on shoes
 Frank LaRue as Slavemaster
 Richard R. Neil as Col. Parrish
 Buddy Roosevelt as Lt. Johnson 
 Jeffrey Sayre as Friend of Marshall
 Carl Voss as Second Lieutenant
 Jack Cooper as Bit role
 Alex Finlayson as Bit role
 Jack Hill as Bit role
 Portia Lanning as Bit role
 Harry Strang as Bit role
 Slim Whittaker as Bit role
 Von the Dog as Von

Awards
The film was nominated for an Academy Award in the category Best Sound Recording (Elmer A. Raguse).

References

External links
 
 
 
 

1936 films
1936 comedy films
American black-and-white films
Films directed by Fred C. Newmeyer
Films directed by Gordon Douglas
Metro-Goldwyn-Mayer films
Our Gang films
American Civil War films
1936 directorial debut films
1930s English-language films
1930s American films